The Rochdale–Bacup line was a branch railway line which ran between Rochdale in Lancashire and Bacup in Lancashire via seven intermediate stops, Wardleworth, Shawclough and Healey, Broadley, Whitworth, Facit, Shawforth, and Britannia.

History

Opening
It opened in two stages, from Rochdale to Facit in 1870, and from Facit to Bacup in 1881.

Closure
Passenger trains were withdrawn from the line in 1947, although the section from Rochdale to Facit remained open to goods trains until 1963 and to Whitworth until 1967.

See also
 Roch Valley Viaduct

References
Lost Railways of Lancashire by Gordon Suggitt

External links
British Railways in 1960, Rochdale to Bacup

Closed railway lines in North West England
Railway lines opened in 1881
Rail transport in Lancashire
Rail transport in Greater Manchester
1881 establishments in England